Valery Igorevich Gromyko or Valeriy Iharavich Hramyka (born 23 January 1997) is a Belarusian footballer. He plays for BATE Borisov.

Club career
On 15 January 2020, Gromyko signed a 3.5-year contract with Russian Premier League club FC Arsenal Tula.

On 30 June 2021, he joined BATE Borisov on loan until the end of 2021. On 28 February 2022, he joined BATE on a permanent basis until the end of 2022.

International
He made his Belarus national football team debut on 8 June 2019 in a Euro 2020 qualifier against Germany, as a starter.

International goal
Scores and results list Belarus' goal tally first.

Honours
Shakhtyor Soligorsk
Belarusian Cup winner: 2018–19

BATE Borisov
Belarusian Super Cup winner: 2022

References

External links

Profile at FC Minsk website

1997 births
Living people
Belarusian footballers
Association football midfielders
Belarusian expatriate footballers
Expatriate footballers in Russia
Belarus youth international footballers
Belarus under-21 international footballers
Belarus international footballers
Russian Premier League players
FC Minsk players
FC Shakhtyor Soligorsk players
FC Arsenal Tula players
FC BATE Borisov players